A Mail Order Hypnotist is a 1912 American silent film drama produced by Chauncey D. Herbert. The film stars Adrienne Kroell and Thmas Flynn.  The film was distributed by the General Film Company and released together with The Los Angeles Police Department or The LAPD. The film status is uncertain but a release flier survives which is now at the Margaret Herrick Library at the Academy of Motion Pictures Arts and Sciences.  The split reel measured around 800 feet (225 m).

Plot
May Johnson is the center of attraction for Rubeville farmer's sons and is especially sought after by Jim Hudson and Lucius Milker.  Lucius has a bit the best of it in May's affections and Jim casts about for something to make his stock stronger.  He reads, in one of the weekly papers, the ad of a correspondence school which guarantees to teach the wonderful art of hypnotism in thirty lessons.  Jims pictures to himself the added advantage he would possess over his rival by the knowledge of this power, and starts of save up his money for the course.  Meanwhile he is steadily losing ground with May while Lucius gains.

At last Jim has money enough to buy the course in hypnotism, and he does so.  He studies the lessons in his own room and his efforts to hypnotize himself are most amusing.

Finally, feeling that he has mastered the subject, he starts out to sway his new-found power over every one he comes in contact with.  Cows, horses and chickens are cautiously approached by Jim, and on all he attempts to practice his new art.  The barnyard inhabitants, however, prove poor subjects and his experiences in this direction afford many a laugh for the crowd that eagerly follows him.  When he finally meets and tries to hypnotize May, his rival, Lucius, thinks it time to interfere, and he does so in rather a rough way.  Jim gives up all hope of winning May and tossing his mail order course aside, he turns to his chores on the farm.

Cast
 Adrienne Kroell - May Johnson
 Thomas Flynn - Lucius Miller
 Edgar G. Wynn - Jim Hudson
 John Lancaster - Jim Hudson's father

Schoolboys, villagers and some others were included in the cast

References

External links
 

1912 films
1912 drama films
American silent short films
1912 short films
Silent American drama films
American black-and-white films
1910s American films
1910s English-language films
English-language drama films
American drama short films